Perrin Henry McGraw (December 28, 1822 McGrawsville, Cortland County, New York – October 16, 1899) was an American merchant and politician from New York.

Life
He was the son of Assemblyman Harry McGraw (c.1797–1849) and Sally (Smith) McGraw (d. 1874). He became a merchant. On April 26, 1846, he married Louisa Pritchard (1824–1890), and they had several children. He was Postmaster of McGrawsville from 1849 to 1853.

He was a member of the New York State Assembly (Cortland Co.) in 1854; and a member of the New York State Senate (23rd D.) in 1860 and 1861.

He was buried at the McGraw Rural Cemetery.

Sources
 The New York Civil List compiled by Franklin Benjamin Hough, Stephen C. Hutchins and Edgar Albert Werner (1867; pg. 442 and 476)
 Biographical Sketches of the State Officers and Members of the Legislature of the State of New York by William D. Murphy (1861; pg. 80ff)
 Tremayne's Table of the Post-Offices in the United States (1850; pg. 111)

External links

1822 births
1899 deaths
Members of the New York State Assembly
New York (state) state senators
People from Cortland County, New York
New York (state) Republicans
New York (state) Whigs
19th-century American politicians
New York (state) postmasters